The Enhanced Graphics Adapter (EGA) is an IBM PC graphics adapter  and de facto computer display standard from 1984 that superseded the CGA standard introduced with the original IBM PC, and was itself superseded by the VGA standard in 1987. In addition to the original EGA card manufactured by IBM, many compatible third-party cards were manufactured, and EGA graphics modes continued to be supported by VGA and later standards.

History 
EGA was introduced in October 1984 by IBM, shortly after its new PC/AT. The EGA could be installed in previously released IBM PCs, but required a ROM upgrade on the mainboard.

Chips and Technologies first product, announced in September 1985, was a four chip EGA chipset that handled the functions of 19 of IBM's proprietary chips on the original Enhanced Graphics Adapter. By that November's COMDEX, more than a half dozen companies had introduced EGA-compatible boards based on C&T's chipset.

Between 1984 and 1987, several third-party manufacturers produced compatible cards, such as the Autoswitch EGA or Genoa Systems Super EGA chipset. Later cards supporting an extended version of the VGA were similarly named Super VGA.

The EGA standard was made obsolete in 1987 by the introduction of MCGA and VGA with the PS/2 computer line.

Adoption 
Commercial software began supporting EGA soon after its introduction, with The Ancient Art of War, released in 1984.  Microsoft Flight Simulator v2.12, Jet, Silent Service, and Cyrus, all released in 1985, offered EGA support, along with Windows 1.0. Sierra's King's Quest III, released in 1986, was one of the earliest mainstream PC games to use it. 

By 1987, EGA support was commonplace. Most software made up to 1991 could run in EGA, although the vast majority of commercial games used 320×200 with 16 colors for backwards compatibility with CGA and Tandy, and to support users who did not own an enhanced EGA monitor. 350-line modes were mostly used by freeware/shareware games and application software, although SimCity is a notable example of a commercial game that runs in 640×350×16 mode.

Hardware design 

The original IBM EGA was an 8-bit PC ISA card with 64 KB of onboard RAM. An optional daughter-board (the Graphics Memory Expansion Card) provided a minimum of 64 KB additional RAM, and up to 192 KB if fully populated with the Graphics Memory Module Kit. Without these upgrades, the card would be limited to four colors in 640×350 mode.

Output was via direct-drive RGB, as with the CGA, but no composite video output was included. MDA and CGA monitors could be driven, as well as newly released enhanced color monitors for use specifically with EGA.

EGA-specific monitors used a dual-sync design which could switch from the 15.7 kHz of 200-line modes to 21.8 kHz for 350-line modes.

Many EGA cards have DIP switches on the back of the card to select the monitor type. If CGA is selected, the card will operate in 200-line mode and use 8x8 characters in text mode. If EGA is selected, the card will operate in 350-line mode and use 8×14 text.

Some third-party cards using the EGA specification were sold with the full 128 KB of RAM from the factory, while others included as much as 256 KB to enable multiple graphics pages, multiple text-mode character sets, and large scrolling displays. A few third-party cards, such as the ATI Technologies EGA Wonder, built on the EGA standard to additionally offer features such as extended graphics modes as high as 800x560 and automatic monitor type detection.

Capabilities 
EGA produces a display of up to 16 colors (using a fixed palette, or one selected from a gamut of 64 colors (6-bit RGB), depending on mode) at several resolutions up to 640×350 pixels, as well as two monochrome modes at higher resolutions. EGA cards include a ROM to extend the system BIOS for additional graphics functions, and a custom CRT controller (CRTC).

The IBM EGA CRTC supports all of the modes of the IBM MDA and CGA adapters through specific mode options, but it is not fully register-compatible with the Motorola MC6845 used in those cards, so software that directly programs the registers to select modes may produce different results on the EGA.

Supported resolutions are 320×200 and 640×200 (on a CGA or EGA monitor), 720×350 and 640×350 (on an MDA monitor) and 320×350 and 640×350 (on an EGA monitor). EGA scans at 21.8 kHz when 350-line modes are used and 15.7 kHz when 200-line modes are used.

In the 640×350 high resolution mode, which requires an enhanced EGA monitor, 16 colors can be selected from a palette comprising all combinations of two bits per pixel for red, green and blue, allowing four levels of intensity for each primary color and 64 colors overall. The 640×200 and 320×200 graphics modes provide backwards compatibility with CGA software and monitors, but permit use of all sixteen colors in the CGA palette simultaneously, instead of the fixed four colors available in those modes on the actual CGA.

EGA's 16-color graphic modes utilize bit planes and mask registers together with CPU bitwise operations to enable accelerated graphics, techniques that would go on to be used in VGA.

Modes 
EGA supports:
 640×350 w/16 colors (from a 6 bit palette of 64 colors), pixel aspect ratio of 1:1.37.
 640×350 w/2 colors, pixel aspect ratio of 1:1.37.
 640×200 w/16 colors, pixel aspect ratio of 1:2.4.
 320×200 w/16 colors, pixel aspect ratio of 1:1.2.

Text modes:
 40×25 with 8×8 pixel font (effective resolution of 320×200)
 80×25 with 8×8 pixel font (effective resolution of 640×200)
 80×25 with 8×14 pixel font (effective resolution of 640×350)
 80×43 with 8×8 pixel font (effective resolution of 640×344)

Extended graphics modes of third party boards:
 640×400
 640×480
 720×540

Color palette 
The EGA palette allows all 16 CGA colors to be used simultaneously, and it allows substitution of each of these colors with any one from a total of 64 colors (two bits each for red, green and blue). This also allows the CGA's alternate brown color to be used without any additional display hardware. The later VGA standard built on this by allowing each of the 64 colors to be further customized.

Standard EGA monitors do not support use of the extended color palette in 200-line modes, because the monitor cannot distinguish between being connected to a CGA card or being connected to an EGA card outputting a 200-line mode. EGA redefines some pins of the connector to carry the extended color information. If the monitor were connected to a CGA card, these pins would not carry valid color information, and the screen might be garbled if the monitor were to interpret them as such. For this reason, standard EGA monitors will use the CGA pin assignment in 200-line modes so the monitor can also be used with a CGA card.

Some EGA monitors are switchable, meaning they can be set up to use the full palette even in 200-line modes, often through a mechanical switch. Only a few commercial games were released with support for the extended color palette in 320×200 or 640×200 (including the DOS version of Super Off Road).

When selecting a color from the EGA palette, two bits are used for the red, green and blue channels. This allows each channel a value of 0, 1, 2 or 3. For instance, to select the color magenta, the red and blue values would be medium intensity (2, or 10 in binary) and the green value would be off (0).

The table below displays an example palette matching the standard 16 CGA colors, with their representations in rgbRGB binary (internal card bit order), decimal and hexadecimal (converted to equivalent 24-bit sRGB web colors). The binary representation is in the form "rgbRGB", where the lowercase letters are the low-intensity bits, and uppercase letters are high-intensity bits.

Specifications 

EGA uses a female nine-pin D-subminiature (DE-9) connector for output, identical to the CGA connector. The signal standard and pinout is backwards-compatible with CGA, allowing EGA monitors to be used on CGA cards and vice versa.

When operating in EGA modes, pins 2, 6 and 7 are repurposed for EGA's secondary RGB signals (see pinout table below). When operating in 200-line CGA modes, the EGA card is fully backwards compatible with a standard IBM CGA monitor; however, third-party monitors had varying compatibility.

Third-party monitors sometimes connected pin two to ground internally. When connected to an EGA card, this shorts the EGA's secondary red output to ground and can damage the card. Also, some monitors were wired with pin two as their sole ground, and these will not work with the EGA.

Conversely, an EGA monitor should work with a CGA adapter, but if it is not set to CGA mode, the secondary red signal will be grounded (always zero) and the secondary blue will be floating (unconnected), causing all high-intensity colors except brown to display incorrectly, and all colors to potentially have a variable blue tint due to the indeterminate state of the unconnected secondary blue.

The IBM 5154 EGA monitor has a special IBM 5153 CGA compatibility mode when operating with CGA sync signals, and it will automatically change to the CGA pinout to avoid all of the mentioned problems when operating in this mode.

Memory mapping 
For color text and CGA graphics modes, video memory is mapped to 16 KB of addresses beginning at address B8000h, and in monochrome (MDA-compatible) text mode, video memory occupies 16 KB beginning at B0000h. These address mappings are for backwards compatibility.

For modes new to the EGA, the video memory begins at address A0000h and occupies 64 KB. The different base addresses for color vs. monochrome modes makes it possible for an EGA to be used simultaneously with a monochrome graphics card in the same computer, or for an EGA in MDA text mode to used simultaneously with a CGA in the same computer.

EGA's native graphics modes are planar, as opposed to the interlaced CGA and Hercules modes. Video memory is divided into four pages (except 640×350×2, which has two pages), one for each component of the RGBI color space, with each bit representing one pixel. If a bit in the red page is enabled, but none of the equivalent bits in the other pages are, a red pixel will appear in that location on-screen. If all the other bits for that particular pixel were also enabled, it would become white, and so forth.

Planes are different sizes depending on the mode:

All planes reside at segment A000 in the CPU's address space. They are bank-switched, and only one plane can be read on the CPU bus at once, however, the programmer may set the control registers on the card to select which planes are written to, which permits writing to several at once. An exception is read mode 1, in which all four planes are read and compared with programmed "Color Compare" data, and a byte indicating the result of comparing all four planes can be read on the I/O bus.

See also

  (Japanese Enhanced Graphics Adapter for AX computers)
 Video card
 Graphics display resolution
 Graphics processing unit
 List of display interfaces
 List of monochrome and RGB color formats6-bit RGB section
 List of 16-bit computer color palettesEGA section
 Professional Graphics Controller
 Hercules InColor Card
 VGA compatible text modeEGA's own modes are just a subset, and all features are nearly the same
 List of defunct graphics chips and card companies

References

External Links 

 Representative screenshots of EGA games

Computer display standards
IBM video hardware
Graphics cards
Computer-related introductions in 1984